The 2014 Madrid Open (also known as the Mutua Madrid Open for sponsorship reasons) was a professional tennis tournament that was played on outdoor clay courts at the Park Manzanares in Madrid, Spain from 3–11 May. It was the 13th edition of the event on the ATP World Tour and 6th on the WTA Tour. It was classified as an ATP World Tour Masters 1000 event on the 2014 ATP World Tour and a Premier Mandatory event on the 2014 WTA Tour.

Ion Țiriac the former Romanian ATP player and now billionaire businessman is the current owner of the tournament.

Points and prize money

Point distribution

Prize money
The prize money for 2014 tournament across all rounds is €4,625,835 for the men's event, and €4,033,254 for the women.

ATP singles main-draw entrants

Seeds

Rankings are as of 28 April 2014.

Other entrants
The following players received wildcards into the main draw:
  Pablo Carreño Busta
  Marius Copil
  Guillermo García López 
  Albert Ramos

The following player received entry using a protected ranking into the main draw:
  Jürgen Melzer

The following players received entry from the qualifying draw:
  Benjamin Becker 
  Teymuraz Gabashvili 
  Santiago Giraldo 
  Andrey Golubev 
  Paul-Henri Mathieu 
  Igor Sijsling 
  Dominic Thiem

The following player received entry as lucky losers:
  Łukasz Kubot
  Marinko Matosevic

Withdrawals
Before the tournament
  Juan Martín del Potro (wrist injury) → replaced by  Federico Delbonis
  Novak Djokovic (arm injury) → replaced by  Marinko Matosevic
  Roger Federer (personal reasons – birth of children) → replaced by  Łukasz Kubot
  Richard Gasquet (back injury) → replaced by  Roberto Bautista Agut
  Florian Mayer → replaced by  Robin Haase
  Gaël Monfils → replaced by  Jérémy Chardy
  Vasek Pospisil → replaced by  Radek Štěpánek
During the tournament
  Dominic Thiem (illness)

Retirements
  Kei Nishikori (back injury)
  Benoît Paire (knee injury)

ATP doubles main-draw entrants

Seeds

Rankings are as of 28 April 2014.

Other entrants
The following pairs received wildcards into the doubles main draw:
  Jonathan Erlich /  Lukáš Rosol
  Feliciano López /  Juan Mónaco

Withdrawals
During the tournament
  John Isner (back injury)
  Milos Raonic (shoulder injury)

WTA singles main-draw entrants

Seeds

Rankings are as of 28 April 2014.

Other entrants
The following players received wildcards into the main draw:
  Lara Arruabarrena
  Irina-Camelia Begu
  Anabel Medina Garrigues
  Sílvia Soler Espinosa
  María Teresa Torró Flor

The following players received entry from the qualifying draw:
  Belinda Bencic
  Petra Cetkovská
  Mariana Duque Mariño 
  Caroline Garcia 
  Julia Görges
  Kristina Mladenovic 
  Monica Niculescu 
  Karolína Plíšková

Withdrawals
Before the tournament
  Victoria Azarenka (foot injury) → replaced by  Lauren Davis
  Bethanie Mattek-Sands → replaced by  Zheng Jie
  Venus Williams (illness) → replaced by  Christina McHale

During the tournament
  Maria Kirilenko (left ankle injury)
  Serena Williams (left thigh injury)

Retirements
  Angelique Kerber (lower back injury)

WTA doubles main-draw entrants

Seeds

Rankings are as of 28 April 2014.

Other entrants
The following pairs received wildcards into the doubles main draw:
  Belinda Bencic /  Maria Kirilenko
  Garbiñe Muguruza /  Carla Suárez Navarro
  Andrea Petkovic /  Sloane Stephens
  Francesca Schiavone /  Sílvia Soler Espinosa

Withdrawals
During the tournament
  Maria Kirilenko (left ankle injury)

Finals

Men's singles

 Rafael Nadal defeated  Kei Nishikori, 2–6, 6–4, 3–0, ret.

Women's singles

 Maria Sharapova defeated  Simona Halep, 1–6, 6–2, 6–3

Men's doubles

 Daniel Nestor /  Nenad Zimonjić defeated  Bob Bryan /  Mike Bryan, 6–4, 6–2

Women's doubles

 Sara Errani /  Roberta Vinci defeated  Garbiñe Muguruza /  Carla Suárez Navarro, 6–4, 6–3

References

External links
 Official website